Nargesi may refer to:
 Nargesi (food)
 Nargesi, Fars
 Nargesi, Kazerun, Fars Province
 Nargesi-ye Deli Qayid Shafi, Fars Province
 Nargesi, Ilam
 Nargesi, Andika, Khuzestan Province
 Nargesi, Izeh, Khuzestan Province
 Nargesi, Masjed Soleyman, Khuzestan Province
 Nargesi-ye Batuli, Khuzestan Province
 Nargesi, Kohgiluyeh and Boyer-Ahmad
 Nargesi-ye Guznan, Kohgiluyeh and Boyer-Ahmad Province